Dishman may refer to:

 Dishman (surname)
 Dishman, Washington
 Dishman Hills Natural Resources Conservation Area
 Dishman Art Museum